Gibberish is speech that at least appears to be nonsense. 

Gibberish may also refer to:

 Gibberish (game), a language game
 "Gibberish" (song), a song by MAX
 "Gibberish", a song by Relient K from the album Two Lefts Don't Make a Right...but Three Do